Choji Hosaka (born 24 November 1920) was a Japanese sport shooter who competed in the 1956 Summer Olympics.

He belonged to the Tokyo Metropolitan Police Department, and during the Asama-Sansō incident, he acted as the leader of the sniper team and made a contribution to neutralize the criminal's sniper rifle by warning shots of his pistol.

References

External links
 

1920 births
Year of death missing
Japanese male sport shooters
ISSF pistol shooters
Olympic shooters of Japan
Shooters at the 1956 Summer Olympics
Shooters at the 1954 Asian Games
Shooters at the 1958 Asian Games
Asian Games medalists in shooting
Medalists at the 1954 Asian Games
Asian Games gold medalists for Japan
Medalists at the 1958 Asian Games
20th-century Japanese people